Assassin's Creed: Blade of Shao Jun, known in Japan as  is a Japanese manga series written and illustrated by Minoji Kurata. The story follows Shao Jun, the protagonist of Ubisoft’s 2015 video game Assassin’s Creed Chronicles: China. It has been serialized in Shogakukan's seinen manga magazine Monthly Sunday Gene-X from 2019 to 2021 and later collected in four tankōbon volumes.

Publication
Assassin's Creed: Blade of Shao Jun, written and illustrated by Minoji Kurata, has been serialized in Shogakukan's seinen manga magazine Monthly Sunday Gene-X from October 19, 2019, to June 17, 2021. Shogakukan has collected its chapters into four individual tankōbon volumes, released from February 19, 2020, to August 19, 2021.

In North America, Viz Media announced the English release of the series in September 2020.

Volume list

Notes

References

External links
 
 at Viz Media

Adventure anime and manga
Comics based on Assassin's Creed
Comics set in China
Manga based on video games
Seinen manga
Shogakukan manga
Viz Media manga